The Natural Science and Technical Academy Isny (German: Naturwissenschaftlich-Technische Akademie Isny, NTA or NTA Isny) is a privately run, state-approved German university focusing in applied sciences, located in Isny im Allgäu.

Since its founding in 1945, it has had a steadily expanding scope, including food chemistry (1967, expanded 1994 to include environmental analysis), physical electronics (1968), pharmaceutical chemistry (1972), and computer science (1992).

The university claims that the physical electronics and pharmaceutical chemistry programs are unique in  Germany.

External links

 

Private universities and colleges in Germany
Universities and colleges in Baden-Württemberg
Educational institutions established in 1945
1945 establishments in Germany
Buildings and structures in Ravensburg (district)